Optical toys form a group of devices with some entertainment value combined with a scientific, optical nature. Many of these were also known as "philosophical toys" when they were developed in the 19th century.

People must have experimented with optical phenomena since prehistoric times and played with objects that influenced the experience of light, color and shadow. In the 16th century some experimental optical entertainment - for instance camera obscura demonstrations - were part of the cabinets of curiosities that emerged at royal courts. Since the 17th century optical tabletop instruments such as the compound microscope and telescope were used for parlour entertainment in richer households .

Other, larger devices - such as peep shows - were usually exhibited by travelling showmen at fairs.

The phenakistiscope, zoetrope, praxinoscope and flip book a.o. are often seen as precursors of film, leading to the invention of cinema at the end of the 19th century. In the 21st century this narrow teleological vision was questioned and the individual qualities of these media gained renewed attention of researchers in the fields of the history of film, science, technology and art. The new digital media raised questions about our knowledge of media history. The tactile qualities of optical toys that allow viewers to study and play with the moving image in their own hands, seem more attractive in a time when digitalisation makes the moving image less tangible.

Several philosophical toys were developed through scientific experimentation, then turned into scientific amusements that demonstrated new ideas and theories in the fields of optics, physics, electricity, mechanics, etc. and ended up as toys for children.

List of optical toys

References

External links

 
Lists of toys